Radisson Blu is a five-star hotel in Chennai, India. It is located on GST Road at Meenambakkam.

History
The hotel was built by Macnur Hospitality Limited, 75 percent of whose equity is held by the M A Chidambaram group, in March 1999 at a cost of  340 million.  In 2001, the hotel was renamed as Radisson GRT after it was bought by the city-based GR Thanga Maaligai.

The hotel
The hotel has 101 rooms including 7 suites, 19 business-class rooms, 24 club rooms and 51 "deluxe rooms".

The hotel initially planned to add another 30 rooms by constructing on the land acquired adjacent to the existing hotel.

See also

 Hotels in Chennai
 Radisson Blu City Centre Chennai

References

Hotels in Chennai
Radisson Blu
1999 establishments in Tamil Nadu
Hotels established in 1999